The Theban Tomb TT23 is located in Sheikh Abd el-Qurna, part of the Theban Necropolis, on the west bank of the Nile, opposite to Luxor. It is the burial place of the ancient Egyptian official, Tjay or Thay called To, who was a royal scribe of the dispatches of the Lord of the Two Lands, during the 19th Dynasty. Thay served during the reign of Merenptah.

Thay was the son of the scribe of soldiers Khaemteri and Tamy. Two wives are mentioned in TT23. Thay is shown with a wife named Raya, who was chief of the harem of Sobek and another wife who is called Nebettawy.

Within the tomb there is an image of a scene showing the tomb owner being rewarded while before Merenptah.

See also
 N. de Garis Davies, Nina and Norman de Garis Davies, Egyptologists
 List of Theban tombs

References

Theban Tombs - A list of the tombs and tomb-chapels allotted numbers University College London 2013 (shows : Tjay - TT23)

External links
Scans of Norman and Nina De Garis Davies' tracings of Theban Tomb 23

B.M. Adams - Tjay Tomb TT23 - Khokha/Sheik Abd el-Qurna published  by B.M.Adams 02.10.2014 using weebly  - shows 27 photographs of the tomb, (Beware: some of the photohraphs presented in this webpage are not from TT 23 but of nearby tomb TT 107 of Nefershekheru, royal scribe during the reign of Amenhotep III.)

Buildings and structures completed in the 13th century BC
Theban tombs